Dibudinic acid, or dibudinate, is an organic compound. It is found in some salts of pharmaceutical drugs like chlordiazepoxide dibudinate, desipramine dibudinate, levopropoxyphene dibudinate, and propranolol dibudinate.

References

Naphthalenes
Sulfonic acids